Harold Poynton (1 March 1936 – 4 June 2018) also known by the nicknames "Fishcake", "Poynton the Pippin", and "Prince of Bamboozlers", was an English professional rugby league footballer who played in the 1950s and 1960s.

Background
Harold Poynton was born in Lupset, Wakefield, West Riding of Yorkshire, England. He was a pupil at St Michael's School, Flanshaw, Wakefield, and then Snapethorpe School, Lupset, Wakefield, and he would watch Wakefield Trinity play over-the-wall without paying. He joined the British Army at age 18, whilst stationed in Germany, he played association football, and for the first time he played rugby football, and he left the army aged 21, and in 1957 he trialled for Wakefield Trinity's A-Team. He worked as a warehouseman , and he later worked as a salesman for a food company. His nickname of "fishcake" originated from his habitual fish and chip shop order following training sessions with Wakefield Trinity, and was given to him by Derek Turner. He and his wife Kath ran newsagent's shops for over 30 years, initially on Hesley Road, Kettlethorpe, Wakefield, and then on Dewsbury Road (opposite Ashleigh Avenue), Lupset, Wakefield. On 15 July 2007 Harold Poynton had the beer Poynton's Pride named after him. Harold Poynton's funeral service took place at Wakefield Cathedral at 11:00am on 21 June 2018, followed by cremation at Wakefield Crematorium at 1:00pm, and a reception at Waterton House.

Playing career

International honours

In addition to the above Test Matches, Harold Poynton also played in the following 1962 Great Britain Lions tour matches; the 24–10 victory over Western New South Wales at Bathurst, New South Wales on Sunday 27 May 1962, the 18–23 defeat by Newcastle at Newcastle, New South Wales on Monday 4 June 1962, the 36–12 victory over Toowoomba at Toowoomba on Sunday 17 June 1962, the 55–8 victory over Central Queensland at Rockhampton on Wednesday 20 June 1962, the 33–31 victory over Far North Queensland at Cairns on Saturday 23 June 1962, the 20–5 victory over New South Wales at Sydney Cricket Ground on Saturday 7 July 1962, the 10–18 defeat by Northern New South Wales at Tamworth, New South Wales on Sunday 8 July 1962, the 81–14 victory over Bay of Plenty at Rotorua on Tuesday 7 August 1962, the 13–46 defeat by Auckland at Auckland on Monday 13 August 1962, the 49–30 victory over South Africa at Pretoria on Thursday 23 August 1962, the 39–33 victory over South Africa at Durban on Saturday 25 August 1962, and the 45–23 victory over South Africa at Johannesburg on Friday 31 August 1962.

County honours
Harold Poynton won a cap for Yorkshire while at Wakefield Trinity, he played , alongside Wakefield Trinity teammates; ; Fred Smith,  left-; Neil Fox, left-; Jack Wilkinson, and right-; Derek Turner in the defeat by Cumberland, at Recreation Ground, Whitehaven on Wednesday 14 September 1960.

Championship final appearances
Harold Poynton played , and was captain, and scored a try in Wakefield Trinity's 21–9 victory over St. Helens in the Championship Final replay during the 1966–67 season at Station Road, Swinton on Wednesday 10 May 1967, played , and was captain, and scored a goal the 17–10 victory over Hull Kingston Rovers in the Championship Final during the 1967–68 season at Headingley Rugby Stadium, Leeds on Saturday 4 May 1968.

Challenge Cup Final appearances
Harold Poynton was injured in Wakefield Trinity's 11–2 victory over Featherstone Rovers in the Challenge Cup semi-final at Odsal Stadium, Bradford on Saturday 9 April 1960, and so he missed the 38–5 victory over Hull F.C. in the 1959–60 Challenge Cup Final, but he played  in Wakefield Trinity's 12–6 victory over Huddersfield in the 1961–62 Challenge Cup Final at Wembley Stadium, London on Saturday 12 May 1962, in front of a crowd of 81,263, played , scored a try, played , and was man of the match winning the Lance Todd Trophy in the 25–10 victory over Wigan in the 1962–63 Challenge Cup Final at Wembley Stadium, London on Saturday 11 May 1963, in front of a crowd of 84,492, and played , and was captain in the 10–11 defeat by Leeds in the 1967–68 Challenge Cup Final (the "Watersplash" final) at Wembley Stadium, London on Saturday 11 May 1968, in front of a crowd of 87,100.

County Cup Final appearances
Harold Poynton played  in Wakefield Trinity's 16–10 victory over Huddersfield in the 1960–61 Yorkshire Cup Final during the 1960–61 season at Headingley Rugby Stadium, Leeds on Saturday 29 October 1960, played  in the 19–9 victory over Leeds in the 1961–62 Yorkshire Cup Final at Odsal Stadium, Bradford on Saturday 11 November 1961, and played  in the 18–2 victory over Leeds in the 1964–65 Yorkshire Cup Final at Fartown, Huddersfield on Saturday 31 October 1964.

Club career
Geoffrey Oakes, Reg Parker, and Harold Poynton made their début for Wakefield Trinity in the 17–12 victory over St. Helens at Belle Vue, Wakefield on Saturday 1 February 1958, in early 1963 he was the subject of a £8,000 transfer bid from St. Helens, (based on inflation, this would be ) (based on increases in average earnings, this would be approximately equivalent to £322,100.00 in 2017), and he played his last match for Wakefield Trinity against Huddersfield at Belle Vue, Wakefield on Saturday 13 September 1969, after which he retired due to a recurring knee injury.

Testimonial match
Harold Poynton's Testimonial match for Wakefield Trinity was the 10–5 victory over the then league-leaders Leeds, at Belle Vue, Wakefield on Monday 15 April 1968.

Honours
Wakefield Trinity
Challenge Cup: 1961–62, 1962–63
Rugby Football League: 1966–67, 1967–68

Family
Harold Poynton's married Kathleen (née Stanley) in 1965 in Wakefield. They had two children; David (born 1966) and Rachel (born 1971).

References

External links
Poynton - "Prince Of Bamboozlers"

1936 births
2018 deaths
20th-century British Army personnel
English rugby league players
Great Britain national rugby league team players
Lance Todd Trophy winners
Rugby league five-eighths
Rugby league halfbacks
Rugby league players from Wakefield
Wakefield Trinity captains
Wakefield Trinity players
Yorkshire rugby league team players